Badhamia is a genus of slime molds in the family Physaraceae. It was circumscribed by English naturalist Miles Joseph Berkeley in 1853. The widespread genus contains about 30 species.

Species

Badhamia affinis
Badhamia apiculospora
Badhamia bibasalis
Badhamia bispora
Badhamia calcaripes
Badhamia capsulifera
Badhamia cinerascens
Badhamia crassipella
Badhamia delicatula
Badhamia dubia
Badhamia foliicola
Badhamia formosana
Badhamia gigantospora
Badhamia goniospora
Badhamia grandispora
Badhamia iowensis
Badhamia lilacina
Badhamia macrocarpa
Badhamia macrospora
Badhamia melanospora
Badhamia nitens
Badhamia ovispora
Badhamia panicea
Badhamia papaveracea
Badhamia populina
Badhamia rhytidosperma
Badhamia rugulosa
Badhamia spinispora
Badhamia utricularis
Badhamia versicolor
Badhamia viridescens

References

Amoebozoa genera
Physaraceae